U.S. Reno Molinella 1911 is an Italian association football club located in Molinella, Emilia-Romagna. It currently plays in Prima Categoria. Its colors are red and blue.

The club was founded in 1911 and spend the 1939–40 season in Serie B.

Edoardo Reja started his career as a manager at Molinella.

References and sources

External links
Official homepage

Football clubs in Italy
Football clubs in Emilia-Romagna
Association football clubs established in 1911
Serie B clubs
Serie C clubs
1911 establishments in Italy